Emma Knox (born 2 March 1978) is an Australian water polo player. She was a member of the Australia women's national water polo team that won a bronze medal at the 2008 Beijing Olympics.

See also
 Australia women's Olympic water polo team records and statistics
 List of Olympic medalists in water polo (women)
 List of women's Olympic water polo tournament goalkeepers
 List of World Aquatics Championships medalists in water polo

References

External links
 

1978 births
Living people
Australian female water polo players
Water polo goalkeepers
Olympic bronze medalists for Australia in water polo
Water polo players at the 2004 Summer Olympics
Water polo players at the 2008 Summer Olympics
Medalists at the 2008 Summer Olympics
21st-century Australian women
Sportswomen from Western Australia
People from Dampier, Western Australia